Måseskär (en: The Gull Skerry) is a rocky island and a lighthouse station located in the sea of Skagerrak on the west coast of Sweden.

History
Since the year 1829, a daymark had been constructed on the island, but it proved not to be enough since many ships were lost in the area. It was demolished during the lighthouse construction. The tower was built after sketches from Swedish lighthouse pioneer Nils Gustaf von Heidenstam. Originally the flame ran on colza oil-lamps and showed red light. In 1884 a kerosene lamp was installed instead, and in 1887 the large lens was changed to a third order fresnel lens with white light. The old lens was divided and placed in two other lighthouses. Electricity came to the island in 1950, but the station was staffed until 1997. It was then one of the last staffed light stations in Sweden along with Söderarm and Holmögadd. In 1978 the old lighthouse was replaced, deactivated and planned for scrapping due to its bad rusty condition. But a rescue group convinced the Swedish Maritime Administration to donate the scrap funding and the lighthouse to them for repairs and historic preservation. They created the Måseskär foundation and works to preserve all light station buildings on the island. The modern lighthouse is still under control of the Swedish Maritime Administration. The old lighthouse is intact and fully operable. Since the year 2000 there is a tradition among the foundation to turn on the light at 00.00 January 1 for a couple of minutes. The island is included as a wind observation station in the shipping news of the Swedish Meteorological and Hydrological Institute.

Climate
The weather station operated at Måseskär indicates an oceanic climate that is heavily moderated by Swedish standards. Many typical features of an oceanic climate is there, such as seasonal lag, low diurnal temperature variation rendering cool days and warm nights, and a lower than normal seasonal temperature variation. Although Måseskär has never recorded a temperature above  it is a hotspot for tropical nights (minima above  due to said maritime influence that keeps the sea warm during summer nights. Remarkably high autumn daily means are also common due to the lag effect. For example, the daily means of September and October are on average warmer than the highs of May and April respectively. Summer nights are also some of the warmest in Sweden. During the coldest month (February) frosts are regular, but rarely severe. Months with daytime averaging below freezing are rare but not impossible, only occurring when inland temperatures are very cold.

See also

 List of lighthouses and lightvessels in Sweden

References

External links
 Sjofartsverket  
 The Swedish Lighthouse Society
 

Islands of Västra Götaland County